Schiltach station is a railway station in the municipality of Schiltach, in Baden-Württemberg, Germany. It is located at the junction of the Kinzig Valley Railway and Eutingen im Gäu–Schiltach railway line of Deutsche Bahn. A third line, the Schiltach-Schramberg railway, formerly branched off to the southeast but was closed in 1990.

Services 
 the following services stop at Schiltach:

References

External links
 
 

Railway stations in Baden-Württemberg
Buildings and structures in Rottweil (district)